"On First Looking into Chapman's Homer" is a sonnet written by the English Romantic poet John Keats (1795–1821) in October 1816. It tells of the author's astonishment while he was reading the works of the ancient Greek poet Homer, who was freely translated by the Elizabethan playwright George Chapman.

The poem has become an often-quoted classic that is cited to demonstrate the emotional power of a great work of art and the ability of great art to create an epiphany in its beholder.

Background information
Keats's generation was familiar enough with the polished literary translations of John Dryden and Alexander Pope, which gave Homer an urbane gloss similar to Virgil but was expressed in blank verse or heroic couplets. Chapman's vigorous and earthy paraphrase (1616) was put before Keats by Charles Cowden Clarke, a friend from his days as a pupil at a boarding school in Enfield Town. They sat up together till daylight to read it: "Keats shouting with delight as some passage of especial energy struck his imagination. At ten o'clock the next morning, Mr. Clarke found the sonnet on his breakfast-table." The poem was first published in The Examiner on 1 December 1816.

Poem

Analysis

The "realms of gold" in the opening line seem to imply worldly riches until the name of Homer appears, when they are recognised as literary and cultural realms. Of the many deities worshipped in the cultures of the Aegean, the god to whom the bards owe the most in fealty is Apollo, the leader of the inspiring Muses. Delos is the sacred island that was Apollo's birthplace. The island-dotted Aegean lies at the eastern end of the Mediterranean and so Keats contrasts the western islands of his own experience with the East Indies, the goal that drew adventurers like Cortés and Balboa to the New World, an example of the submerged imagery behind the text that is typical of Keats's technique.

The second quatrain introduces "one wide expanse" that was ruled by Homer but was "heard of", rather than known to Keats at first-hand since Homer wrote in Greek, and Keats, like most other cultured Englishmen of his time, was at ease only in Latin. The "wide expanse" might have been a horizon of land or sea, but in Keats's breathing, its "pure serene", that is now sensed encompasses the whole atmosphere, and in it, Chapman's voice rings out. That sense of fresh discovery brings the reader to the volta: "Then felt I...".

The reference to a "new planet" would have been salient to contemporary readers because of the recent discovery of Uranus with a telescope in 1781 by William Herschel, Court Astronomer to George III. News of Herschel's discovery was sensational, as it was the first "new" planet to be discovered since antiquity.

Members of Vasco Núñez de Balboa's expedition were the first Europeans to see the eastern shore of the Pacific (1513), but Keats chose to use Hernán Cortés. "Darien" refers to Darién Province, in Panama. Keats had been reading William Robertson's History of America and apparently conflated two scenes that it describes: Balboa's view of the Pacific and Cortés's first view of the Valley of Mexico (1519).

The Balboa passage: "At length the Indians assured them, that from the top of the next mountain they should discover the ocean which was the object of their wishes. When, with infinite toil, they had climbed up the greater part of the steep ascent, Balboa commanded his men to halt, and advanced alone to the summit, that he might be the first who should enjoy a spectacle which he had so long desired. As soon as he beheld the South Sea stretching in endless prospect below him, he fell on his knees, and lifting up his hands to Heaven, returned thanks to God, who had conducted him to a discovery so beneficial to his country, and so honourable to himself. His followers, observing his transports of joy, rushed forward to join in his wonder, exultation, and gratitude" (Vol. III).

Before Cortés's 1519–21 conquest of the Aztec Empire, he had been a colonist, administrator and conquistador in Hispaniola (from 1504) and Cuba (from 1511). He never traveled to Darién but may have seen the Pacific sometime after his conquest of the Aztec Empire or during his 1524–1526 visit to Honduras. Later during his governorship of Mexico, Cortés was a major explorer of the Pacific coast of Mexico and Baja California.

Since Cortés was never in Darién, Keats made an historical error. The standard critical view is that Keats simply remembered the grand but separate images of Cortés and of Darien, rather than their historical contexts.

In retrospect, Homer's "pure serene" has prepared the reader for the Pacific and so the analogy now expressed in the simile that identifies the wide expanse of Homer's demesne with the vast Pacific, which stuns its discoverers into silence, is felt to be the more just.

Keats altered "wondr'ing eyes" (in the original manuscript) to "eagle eyes" and "Yet could I never judge what Men could mean" (which was the seventh line even in the first publication in The Examiner) to "Yet did I never breathe its pure serene".

Structure
This poem is a Petrarchan sonnet, also known as an Italian sonnet, divided into an octave and a sestet, with a rhyme scheme of a-b-b-a-a-b-b-a-c-d-c-d-c-d. After the main idea has been introduced and the image played upon in the octave, the poem undergoes a volta, a change in the persona's train of thought. The octave offers the poet as a literary explorer, but the volta brings in the discovery of Chapman's Homer, the subject of which is further expanded through the use of imagery and comparisons which convey the poet's sense of awe at the discovery.

As is typical of sonnets in English, the metre is iambic pentameter though not all of the lines scan perfectly (line 12 has an extra syllable, for example).

Cultural references
Edgar Allan Poe was inspired by Keats's writing about the discovery of Uranus when he wrote his early poem "Al Aaraaf" (1829).
 The book 1066 and All That, a parody of school history textbooks, contains two references to the poem. The first is the following extract: "A Darien Scheme. The Scots were now in a skirling uproar because James II was the last of the Scottish Kings and England was under the rule of the Dutch Orange; it was therefore decided to put them in charge of a very fat man called Cortez and transport them to a Peak in Darien, where it was hoped they would be more silent". The second is in a mock test paper, question 2 is "Outline joyfully (1) Henry VIII, (2) Stout Cortez."
Frances Power Cobbe analysed the poem in her essay "The Peak in Darien: the riddle of death" in The Peak in Darien with some other inquiries touching concerns of the soul and the body: an octave of essays, Boston. 1882.
 Henry James refers to Keats's sonnet in Book 2 of The Golden Bowl (1904), in his description of Adam Verver's discovery of his passion for collecting objects of art.
 Charles Olson alludes to Keats' poem in his epic The Maximus Poems with the poem "On first Looking out through Juan de la Cosa's Eyes".
 In a postscript to the novel The Clicking of Cuthburt, P. G. Wodehouse says "In the second chapter I allude to Stout Cortez staring at the Pacific. Shortly after the appearance of this narrative in serial form in America, I received an anonymous letter containing the words, "You big stiff, it wasn't Cortez, it was Balboa." On the other hand, if Cortez was good enough for Keats, he is good enough for me. Besides, even if it was Balboa, the Pacific was open to being stared at about that time, and I see no reason why Cortez should not have had a look at it as well."
 In the P. G. Wodehouse novel The Inimitable Jeeves, Bertie Wooster states that his cousins "looked at each other, like those chappies in the poem, with a wild surmise."
 In the P.G. Wodehouse novel Aunts Aren't Gentleman, when Bertie Wooster finds himself suddenly engaged, he states that he stood frozen, "eyes bulging like those of the fellows I've heard Jeeves mention, who looked at each other with a wild surmise, silent upon a peak in Darien."
 The first chapter of Arthur Ransome's Swallows and Amazons is titled "A Peak in Darien" and is headed with the last four lines of the sonnet. Titty gives the name "Darien" to the headland from which the Swallows first see the lake. The quotation crops up again in Peter Duck, prompting Bill to ask "Who's fat Cortez?"
 Brian O'Nolan used Keats and Chapman as running characters in his "Cruiskeen Lawn" columns in the Irish Times, usually living out shaggy dog stories leading up to increasingly elaborate puns.
 Freya Stark alludes to the poem in the title of "A Peak in Darien" (London, 1976).
 Vladimir Nabokov refers to the poem in his novel Pale Fire when the fictional poet John Shade mentions a newspaper headline that attributes a recent Boston Red Sox victory to "Chapman's Homer" (i.e. to a home run by a player named Chapman).
 Australian poet Peter Porter opens the fourth of  "The Sanitised Sonnets" with the allusion: "Much have I travelled in the realms of gold/ for which I thank the Paddington and Westminster/ Public Libraries" (London, 1970).
 There is a witticism, of unknown origin, which describes a gourmet savouring a superb parfait as "silent upon a peak in dairying".
 Gilbert Adair wrote a long article entitled "On First Looking into Chaplin's Humour".
 Tobias Wolff references the last line of the sonnet ("Silent, upon a peak in Darien") in "Bullet in the Brain,” which focuses on the death of a doomed critic obsessed with errors and mocking them. 
 In the Season 5 episode "Operation Righteous Cowboy Lightning" of the sitcom 30 Rock, Alec Baldwin's character, Jack Donaghy, quotes the poem while musing on his new start as an executive for the company Kabletown. Tracy Morgan's character, Tracy Jordan, later mentions "Stout Cortez" (his gardener), as well.
 New Zealand artist Michael Parekowhai created a monumental artwork entitled "On First Looking into Chapman's Homer" for the Venice Biennale 2011. 
 Historian of science Edward B. (Ted) Davis published a pastiche, "On First, Looking into Chapman's Homer", about a long home run by Mickey Mantle, in Aethlon: The Journal of Sport Literature 29(1), Fall 2011/Winter 2012, p. 35 (but it actually appeared in August 2013). The addition of a comma in Keats' title provides an indispensable pun—a clue to the reader about the subject of the pastiche. Davis writes how "stout Mantle" stood and "Watch’d his ball just rise and rise and rise – Silent, above a park in Washington."
 The title of Patrick Kavanagh's poem "On Looking into E. V. Rieu's Homer", about E. V. Rieu's Homer translations, is an allusion on the title of Keats' poem.
 In Saki's story "The Talking-out of Tarrington", a character is greeted with a silent-upon-a-peak-in-Darien' stare which denoted an absence of all previous acquaintance with the object scrutinised".
 In the second volume of Richard Dawkins' autobiography, Brief Candle in the Dark, he alludes to the poem in chapter three, "Lore of the Jungle", when he describes going mountain climbing in Panama (p. 43).
 Progressive rock band Genesis, in their Song "Watcher of the Skies" (album Foxtrot) appear to reference the poem – specifically with the line "Raising his eyes beholds a planet unknown".

References

External links

 
 Discusses the creation of the poem, and also shows the original manuscript.
Chapman's Homer: The Iliads and The Odysseys

Poetry by John Keats
Sonnets
1816 poems
Cultural depictions of Homer